Md Jahurul Haque commissioner of the Anti-Corruption Commission and former Chairman of Bangladesh Telecommunication Regulatory Commission. He is the former Dhaka Metropolitan Sessions Judge.

Early life 
Haque was born on 5 December 1955 in Jamalpur district, East Pakistan, Pakistan.

Career 
Haque joined the judicial branch of Bangladesh Civil Service in 1983.

In 2012, Haque indicted chairman of Ekushey Television Abdus Salam and it's managing director Ashraful Alam on tax evasion charges.

On 14 July 2014, Haque ordered the arrest of the top management of Destiny Group. Haque presided over the Dhaka Metropolitan Sessions Judge's Court in 2014. He heard the hearing of the case against Muhammad Jasimuddin Rahmani. He also held the hearing against former President Hussain Muhammad Ershad in a corruption case relating to the purchase of Rader in a case from 1992. He placed indictments against Oishee Rahman over the murder of her parents; her father was a police officer and the incident was made adapted in web based TV show titled August 14.  He had also sent Roads and Highways Department engineer Abdul Malek to seven years imprisonment. He accepted charges against Moudud Ahmed, Bangladesh Nationalist Party politician, and Monjur Ahmed, his brother, on charges of land grab in Gulshan.

In 2014, Haque retired as a Sessions Judge.

Haque had served as the legal and licensing commissioner of Bangladesh Telecommunication Regulatory Commission. He tried to collect nearly 85 billion taka from telecom operators in back taxes in 2019.

Haque was appointed chairman of Bangladesh Telecommunication Regulatory Commission on 31 January 2019 replacing Dr. Shahjahan Mahmood. During his term, Bangladesh Telecommunication Regulatory Commission blocked the official website of Bangladesh Nationalist Party in 2018 during national elections. During his term, the ownership of cellphone towers was shifted from cellphone companies to independent contractors under a decision to not allow cell phone operators to own towers.

Haque was appointed commissioner of the Anti-Corruption Commission on 10 March 2021. He considered investigating the additional secretary to the Health Services Division, Kazi Jebunnesa Begum, after she assaulted, Rozina Islam, a journalist of Prothom Alo and filed a case against her under Official Secrecy Act.

References 

Living people
1955 births
People from Jamalpur District
Bangladeshi civil servants
Bangladeshi judges